Huibert Gerard Boumeester (Batavia, Dutch East Indies [now Jakarta] 18 October 1900 – Utrecht, 6 December 1959) was a Dutch rower.

In 1920, he competed at the Summer Olympic Games in Antwerp, as a member of the Dutch Men's Eight With Coxswain (8+) rowing team. He was the youngest member of the Dutch team. The rowing competitions took place at the Willebroek canal, near Brussels. The course started near the Three Fountains inn in Vilvoorde, and ran to the Marly coking plant in Neder-Over-Heembeek. The Dutch team was eliminated in the first round by the French.

He was a member of the  DSRV Laga rowing club in Delft. By profession he was an electronics engineer.

References

1900 births
1959 deaths
Dutch male rowers
Olympic rowers of the Netherlands
Rowers at the 1920 Summer Olympics
People from Batavia, Dutch East Indies
Dutch people of the Dutch East Indies